Tito Tettamanti (born 6 October 1930) is a Swiss lawyer, politician, and businessman.

Tito Tettamanti, born in Lugano, Switzerland, the son of a Swiss banker, studied at the Faculty of Law at Berne University where he graduated in 1953 at the age of 23. He passed the bar exam in 1955 and qualified as a lawyer.

He was an activist of the Christian Democratic People’s Party of Switzerland (Partito Popolare Democratico) and was elected as member of the Grand Council of the Canton of Ticino. In 1959 he was elected at the Council of States until July 9, 1960. He was removed from his political mandate for tax fraud.

In 1959 Tettamanti founded the law and notary firm Tettamanti-Spiess-Dotta  and at the end of 1960 he founded the fiduciary company Fidinam SA, which initially assisted said law and notary firm Tettamanti-Spiess-Dotta in providing administrative and accounting services to its clients and later became one of the 10 most important Swiss fiduciary companies. He served as Managing Director of Fidinam for 25 years and today he holds the title of Honorary Chairman of the Fidinam Group.

In the 60’s and 70’s, he worked as a real estate investor, among others, in Ticino and Canada, and he collaborated with the Banca della Svizzera Italiana, of which he was an important shareholder. In the 80’s, he transferred the center of his activities as an investor to New York, remaining active in Wall Street until 1987.

Considered in the 1990s as the "king of offshore", Fidinam has long benefited from its strategic position on an axis between Italy and Liechtenstein, and then, from there, all tax havens. The company appeared in the 1990s and 2000s in several political-financial scandals (Tangentopoli, Parmalat, Enimont, etc.). It was also involved in a case of hidden financing of the far-right party Lega Lombarda.

Afterwards Tettamanti returned to Switzerland and specialized in the acquisition and management of large Swiss companies such as Sulzer, Saurer (between 1988 and 1992 he was appointed president of the Saurer Group Holding AG and Saurer Group Investment Ltd, whereas in June 1994 he served as member of the board of directors and until 2000 as honorary president), Rieter, Ascom Holding, and SIG. In Spring 2010 Tettamanti acquired the Basler Zeitung, the main newspaper of the northwestern part of Switzerland, whose control was held, with a short interruption, until the final sale in 2014. From March 2002 to the end of 2006 Tettamanti was the largest shareholder of the Swiss publishing house Jean Frey AG, which was eventually sold to the Axel-Springer-Verlag.

From December 13, 2002 until May 15, 2006 Tettamanti served as member and Chairman of the Board of Directors of the pharmaceutical consultancy company Interpacific International Limited.

Tettamanti served as Chairman of the Board of Directors of Sterling Strategic Value Limited until 2012 and thereafter he served as Honorary Chairman. In January 2017 Sterling Strategic Value Limited was converted into a Luxembourg alternative investment fund and Tettamanti still serves as Honorary Chairman. He has furthermore been Chairman of the Board of Directors of several companies including ST Group Holding Inc., ST Real Estate Holding Inc., and ST Services Holding Inc. and he is currently honorary Chairman of ST Real Estate Holding Inc., ST Australia Real Estate Inc., and ST USA Real Estate Inc.

Tettamanti is founder of the Swiss Civil Society Association and served as Chairman until 2013  and has also held the position of "Governor" and Vice President of the European Policy Forum in London.  Since 2008 Tettamanti has been Chairman of the Fidinam Foundation, a nonprofit entity whose aim is to support initiatives in the fields of education, research, health, and various projects with social and economic needs background in Ticino and other regions of Switzerland.The Fidinam Foundation  is under the supervision of the Swiss Federal Department of Internal Affairs. The board of the Fidinam Foundation is also composed of Massimo Pedrazzini, Roberto Grassi, Tiziano Moccetti, Alessandra Niedecker and Konrad Hummler. In addition, since 2009 Tettamanti has been Chairman of the Fidinam International Charity Foundation.

After several years spent in London, since 2010 Tettamanti lives in Lugano. He often participates to conferences, public discussions, TV, and radio programs. Passionate and thorough scholar of political cultural and international economic issues, he regularly writes as a columnist on the Corriere del Ticino and Die Zeit, dealing often with socio-economic topics.

In 2018 Tettamanti had estimated personal assets for CHF 950 million.

In October 2021, his name was mentioned in the Pandora Papers.

Bibliography
Tettamanti is the author of several books. His works include Quale Europa?, published in 1993 by Giampiero Casagrande Editore in Italian, in German and in French. Together with Alfredo Bernasconi in 1996 he wrote Manifesto per una società liberale, published in German by Ammann Verlag, Zurich, and in Italian in 1995 by Sperling & Kupfer, Milan,. In 2002 he was the author of The seven sins of the Capital, published by Sperling & Kupfer, Milan, which in its German version is named "Die sieben Sünden des Kapitals", Bilanz, Zurich, 2003, in 2017 he was co-author of T contro T - Te lo do io il liberismo, published in Italian by Edizioni San Giorgio, Muzzano and in 2018 he wrote Flash, published by Armando Dado' Editore, Locarno. In 2019 he wrote together with Alfonso Tuor the book named "T contro T - Disuguaglianza, disagio, democrazia" published in Italian by Edizioni San Giorgio, Muzzano. His last book named ''T contro T - Un mondo in crisi - rivolte o rivoluzione'' published in Italian by Edizioni San Giorgio, Muzzano, wrote together with Alfonso Tuor, was published in 2021.

Notes 

20th-century Swiss lawyers
1930 births
Living people
People from Lugano